The list of shipwrecks in 1796 includes ships sunk, foundered, wrecked, grounded or otherwise lost during 1796.

January

2 January

5 January

11 January

13 January

23 January

24 January

26 January

28 January

29 January

Unknown date

February

2 February

6 February

8 February

9 February

10 February

15 February

17 February

Unknown date

March

3 March

7 March

8 March

20 March

25 March

26 March

Unknown date

April

11 April

30 April

Unknown date

May

22 May

25 May

26 May

28 May

31 May

Unknown date

June

10 June

16 June

30 June

Unknown date

July

1 July

6 July

8 July

13 July

15 July

17 July

21 July

Unknown date

August

14 August

15 August

22 August

27 August

28 August

Unknown date

September

19 September

22 September

Unknown date

October

3 October

5 October

9 October

11 October

16 October

25 October

26 October

30 October

Unknown date

November

25 November

29 November

Unknown date

December

5 December

13 December

16 December

18 December

19 December

24 December

25 December

27 December

29 December

30 December

Unknown date

Unknown date

References

1796